Blue River Township is one of nine townships in Hancock County, Indiana, United States. As of the 2010 census, its population was 1,417 and it contained 542 housing units.

History
Blue River was organized in 1828. It was named from the Blue River, once an important waterway for mills.

County Line Bridge was listed on the National Register of Historic Places in 1994.

Geography
The streams of Dilly Creek and Nameless Creek run through this township.

Unincorporated towns
 Westland
(This list is based on USGS data and may include former settlements.)

Adjacent townships
 Jackson Township (north)
 Ripley Township, Rush County (east)
 Hanover Township, Shelby County (south)
 Brandywine Township (west)
 Center Township (northwest)

Cemeteries
The township contains three cemeteries: Gilboa, Haskett, and Westland Friends Church.

References
Notes

Sources
 
 United States Census Bureau cartographic boundary files

External links
 Indiana Township Association
 United Township Association of Indiana

Townships in Hancock County, Indiana
Townships in Indiana